"Anacani" María Consuelo Castillo-López y Cantor-Montoya (born April 10, 1954) is a Mexican singer best known as a featured performer on The Lawrence Welk Show television program.

Born in Sinaloa, Mexico, as the sixth of seven children of Spanish and French parents, she moved with her family to the United States when she was a child. It was during that time she began to sing thanks in large part to her family's talented musical background. When she was in middle school, during a family trip back to Mexico, her singing talents were discovered by a television producer which led to appearances on the variety show Las Estrellas y Usted (The Stars and You) followed by several more appearances on Latin American television and live concert tours as well.

After completing high school, Anacani's career took a new turn when she and her family went to the Lawrence Welk Resort in Escondido, California, where she was discovered by bandleader Lawrence Welk himself. Soon enough, she was the resort's singing hostess and later made her first appearance on the Lawrence Welk Show in January 1973. After a few more guest appearances, she was soon hired as a regular performer on the show.

During the course of the show's run, and afterward, she was popular as a soloist with songs like "Vaya Con Dios", "Luna", and "It's Impossible". She also did duets with fellow Welk star Tanya Falan, toured with rest of the music makers on the road and released an album called Lawrence Welk presents Anacani through Ranwood Records and she serves as the Latino spokesman for Yuban Coffee. She also had a bit part in the 1981 feature film Zoot Suit.

Today, Anacani lives in Escondido with her husband Rudy Echeverria and her daughter Priscila. In addition to singing, she is also an accomplished clothing designer and seamstress. She still sings with members of her Welk musical family across the country at county fairs, resorts plus many other venues. She is also a guest soloist with many symphony orchestras; and since the early 1980s has worked the telethon for the West Texas Rehabilitation Center in Abilene, Texas.

References

External links
Anacani Webpage

Welkgirls

1954 births
Living people
Mexican emigrants to the United States
Singers from Sinaloa
Lawrence Welk